East End Bridge may refer to:

East Huntington Bridge, also called East End Bridge, in Huntington, West Virginia, U.S.
Lewis and Clark Bridge (Ohio River), also called East End Bridge, in Louisville, Kentucky, U.S.

See also
East End (disambiguation)